Strike Force Bowling is a video game of the sports genre released in 2004 by LAB Rats. A previous game, Fast Lanes Bowling, was published by Enlight Software for Microsoft Windows. The two games are very similar sharing the same physics engine and graphics, although Strike Force featured more locations as well as left-handed, and reverse-hook bowlers. LAB Rats assisted in the development of Brunswick Circuit Pro Bowling so the game has the same physics engine, but has a more fantasy-oriented theme. Strike Force features 14 places to Bowl (12 in Fast Lanes) and 8 Playable characters. There are only 7 locations, but each has its own "nighttime" variant which is unlocked as a secret stage. It also features Golf Mode, Challenge Mode, Skins, and Tournaments. There are also 14 different bowling balls to use, such as the Lightning, and level specific ones like the Bone Crasher and Pharaoh's Magic.

Reception

The Xbox version and Fast Lanes Bowling received "mixed" reviews, while the PlayStation 2 and GameCube versions received "generally unfavorable reviews", according to the review aggregation website Metacritic. TeamXbox gave the game a mixed review about two months before its U.S. release date.

References

External links

2004 video games
Crave Entertainment games
GameCube games
PlayStation 2 games
PlayStation Network games
Windows games
Xbox games
Bowling video games
Multiplayer and single-player video games
Video games developed in the United States
RenderWare games